Jacob Dirk "Jaap" Kelderman (2 January 1928 – 4 February 1976) was a Dutch association football player, who played as a goalkeeper for Ajax.

Club career
Kelderman played in the youth of SDOB from the town of Broek in Waterland, and was later picked up by Dutch giants, Ajax. On 12 September 1948, Jaap made his first team debut for Ajax in a Netherlands Championship match against Xerxes. At the end of the season he played in two matches – against Sparta and ADO.

In September 1949 Kelderman with Rinus Michels got into a car accident in France.

References

External links
 Jaap Kelderman statistics at afc-ajax.info

1928 births
1976 deaths
Association football goalkeepers
Dutch footballers
AFC Ajax players
People from Waterland
VV Monnickendam players
Footballers from North Holland